D. H. Springhouse is a historic springhouse located at Bel Air, Harford County, Maryland.  It is a little gray stone building set into the base of a steep hill. This is a stone springhouse with a schoolroom above, 16.5 feet by 23 feet, with one narrow wall set into the bank over several fresh springs. It was built about 1816, and the quality of stonemasonry is notable.

It was listed on the National Register of Historic Places in 1973.

References

External links
, including photo from 1999, at Maryland Historical Trust

Buildings and structures in Harford County, Maryland
Infrastructure completed in 1816
School buildings completed in 1816
School buildings on the National Register of Historic Places in Maryland
Agricultural buildings and structures on the National Register of Historic Places in Maryland
Water supply infrastructure on the National Register of Historic Places
1816 establishments in Maryland
National Register of Historic Places in Harford County, Maryland
Spring houses